Boztepe Dam may refer to:

 Boztepe Dam (Malatya), a dam in Turkey
 Boztepe Dam (Tokat), a dam in Turkey